Arthur Van De Vijver (29 February 1948 – 9 March 1992) was a Belgian racing cyclist. He rode in the 1974 Tour de France.

References

External links
 

1948 births
1992 deaths
Belgian male cyclists